This is a list of airports in Tuvalu.

Tuvalu, formerly known as the Ellice Islands, is a Polynesian island country located in the Pacific Ocean, midway between Hawaii and Australia. Its nearest neighbours are Kiribati, Nauru, Samoa and Fiji. It comprises four reef islands and five true atolls. Its population of  10,507 (2017 Census) makes it among the least-populated sovereign states in the world.



Airports

History
Funafuti Airfield was built by United States Navy Seabee construction battalions in 1943 during World War II. It was later sealed to create Funafuti International Airport.

During World War II, the American forces also built airfields on Nanumea and Motulalo, which is the largest atoll of Nukufetau. After the war these two airfields were dismantled.

See also 
 Transport in Tuvalu
 List of airports by ICAO code: N#NG - Kiribati (Gilbert Islands), Tuvalu
 Wikipedia:WikiProject Aviation/Airline destination lists: Oceania#Tuvalu

References 

 
  - includes IATA codes
 Great Circle Mapper: Airports in Tuvalu - IATA and ICAO codes

Tuvalu
 
Tuvalu
Airports